Castleboy is a civil parish and townland (of 151 acres) in County Down, Northern Ireland. It is situated in the historic barony of Ards Upper.

Settlements
The civil parish contains the village of Cloghy.

Townlands
Castleboy civil parish contains the following townlands:

Ballyadam
Broom Quarter
Castleboy
Cloghy
Drumardan
Drumardan Quarter
Loughdoo
Tullycross
Tullytramon

See also
List of civil parishes of County Down

References